Global News Hour at 6 (also known as Global News at 6 and Global News at 5:30) is the name of local newscasts that air on Global, each city has a different edition of the program. The show debuted in 1968, originating at CHAN-TV Vancouver (then a CTV affiliate). Global News Hour at 6 airs on CHAN-DT Vancouver, CICT-DT Calgary, and CITV-DT Edmonton. CHBC-DT Kelowna's flagship newscast is the hour-long Global News at 5. CIII-DT Toronto and CKMI-DT Montreal both air newscasts known as Global News at 5:30 (one hour long in Toronto and half an hour in Montreal, which is followed by another half-hour newscast at 6:30). CFRE-DT Regina, CFSK-DT Saskatoon, CKND-DT Winnipeg, CISA-DT Lethbridge, CHNB-DT Saint John, and CIHF-DT Halifax all air half-hour newscasts known as Global News at 6. CHAN, CITV, and CICT, CFRE, and CFSK also air a 5PM newscast known as Global News at 5 (previously Early News), which airs before Global National.

Global BC

Global News Hour at 6 on CHAN-DT airs at 6 pm every weeknight. Global News Hour at 6 is co-hosted by Chris Gailus and Sophie Lui with Kristi Gordon as meteorologist and Squire Barnes as sports host. Global News at 5 is anchored by Sophie Lui with Kristi Gordon as meteorologist and Squire Barnes as sports anchor.

Notable former personalities
 Frank Griffiths, 1963–1994 (deceased)
 Pamela Martin, 1977-2001 (Now Director of Outreach for Premier Christy Clark)
 Jack Webster,  1978–1987 (deceased)
 Harvey Oberfeld, 1979–2006
 Jennifer Mather, 1991–1998 (Now at CTV News Channel) in Toronto
 Mi-Jung Lee, 1992-1998 (Now at CTV Vancouver)
 Bill Good Jr., 1993-2001 (Retired at CKNW AM in August 2014)
 Rena Heer, (2005–2007) (Now at CTV Vancouver)
 Kevin Newman, (2001–2008, 2008-2010 at Ottawa anchoring Global National but retired on August 20, 2010, now at CTV)
 Tara Nelson, (2005-2008, Now at CTV Calgary)
 Tony Parsons - News Hour anchor (1975–2009, formerly anchor CHEK Victoria and CBC Vancouver from 2010 to 2013)

Global Okanagan / E! Okanagan

CHBC-DT airs an hour-long program known as Global News at 5 (previously CHBC News at 5) as their flagship news program. CHBC also has a half-hour program called Global News at 6:30 which airs after Global National. Global News at 5 is anchored by Kimberly Davidson. Global News at 6:30 is anchored by Doris Maria Bregolisste and Kimberly Davidson. These newscasts were titled CHBC News during its affiliation with CH and later E!.

Global Edmonton

Global News Hour at 6 on CITV-DT is anchored by Scott Roberts and Carole-Anne Devaney on weekdays and Breanna Karstens-Smith on weekends. Jesse Beyer hosts weather on weekdays and Kevin O'Connell on weekends. Global News at 5 is anchored by Scott Roberts.

Notable former personalities
 Rob Brown - reporter (1999–2002; now with CBC Calgary)
 Darren Dutchyshen - sports (1987–1995; now with TSN)
 Carolyn Jarvis - reporter (2005–2009; formerly presenter of 16:9: The Bigger Picture, now chief investigative correspondent for Global National)
 Doug Main - anchor (1975–1988)
 Claire Martin - weather (1996–2005; 2005-2016 with CBC)
 Bill Matheson - weather (1976–1999; deceased)
 Tara Nelson - reporter (now anchor CTV Calgary)
 Kathy Tomlinson - reporter (now with CBC British Columbia)
 Gord Steinke - anchor (retired)

Global Calgary

Global News at 6 on CICT-DT is anchored by Linda Olsen on weekdays and Jayme Doll on weekends. Paul Dunphy hosts weather on weekdays and Jodi Hughes on weekends. Global News at 5 is anchored by Linda Olsen.

Notable former personalities
 Ashleigh Banfield (was with MSNBC, now at TruTV, formerly Court TV)
 Ed Whalen - deceased - was with CICT (then known as CHCT-TV) the first day it went on the air. News and Sports Director, news anchor & editorial. Host of Stampede Wrestling. Later, sports anchor and Calgary Flames play-by-play announcer.  (Also worked for CFAC Radio and Calgary Sun)

Global Regina

Global News at 6 on CFRE-DT is anchored by Carlyle Fiset with CFSK meteorologist Peter Quinlan doing the weather. Global News at 5 and Global News at 10 is anchored by Carlyle Fiset and Elise Darwish.

Global Saskatoon
Global News at 6 on CFSK-DT is produced in Regina and anchored by Carlyle Fiset with local meteorologist Peter Quinlan doing the weather. It was previously produced locally from Saskatoon, however when longtime Global Saskatoon personality Julie Mintenko departed the station, the decision was made to centralize production in Regina. Global News at 5 and Global News at 10 is anchored by Carlyle Fiset and Elise Darwish.

Global Winnipeg

Global News at 6 on CKND-DT is anchored by Lisa Dutton with Mike Koncan on weather on weekdays and Mark Carcasole (from Toronto) with Ross Hull on weather and Anthony Bruno on sports on weekends. Global News at 10 is anchored by Lisa Dutton and Kevin Hirschfield along with Mike Koncan on weather and Russ Hobson on sports on weekdays and Mark Carcasole (from Toronto) with Mike Arsenault on weather and Megan Robinson on sports on weekends.

Notable former personalities
 Don Marks - news anchor
 Jeremy St. Louis - weather person
 Andrea Slobodian - weather/community anchor (now with Communications and Stakeholder Relations at the Manitoba Legislature)
 Diana Swain - news anchor (currently Feature Reporter with CBC News: The National)
 Peter Chura - news anchor (ran as a Manitoba Liberal in the 2016 Manitoba General Election)
Dawna Friesen - news anchor (now Global National anchor)

Global Toronto

Global News at 5:30 on CIII-DT is anchored by Alan Carter and Farah Nasser with Anthony Farnell on weather. Global News at 11 is anchored by Crystal Goomansingh with Mike Arsenault or Ross Hull on weather and Rob Leth on sports. Global News at 6, which is only half an hour long, is anchored by Mark Carcasole with Ross Hull on weather and Anthony Bruno on sports on weekends.

Notable personalities
Carolyn MacKenzie - anchor on The Morning Show. Formerly anchor of News Hour Final

Notable former personalities
 Robin Gill - anchor, 2008–2009; now with Global National
 Anne-Marie Mediwake - anchor, 2006–2007; later with CBC News Network and CBC Toronto, now with CTV News, as the host of Your Morning
Leslie Roberts - anchor

E! Hamilton

After Canwest acquired the assets of Western International Communications in 2000, Canwest relaunched CHCH-DT as "CH Hamilton" and later the CH system in 2001, but was rebranded to E! in 2007. These programs featured such as Live @ 5:30, a debate talk show hosted by Mark Hebscher and Donna Skelly, CHCH News at 6:00 (formerly CH News at 6) with Matt Hayes on weather and CHCH News at 11:00 (formerly CH News Final). The station continues to produce its own newscasts after CHCH was sold to Channel Zero in 2009.

Former on-air staff 
 Nick Dixon - anchor, currently with CP24
 Michelle Dubé – reporter and anchor; now reporter and anchor for CTV Toronto
 Heather Hiscox – anchor and executive producer; now news anchor for CBC News Network
 Dan McLean – senior news anchor (1970–2008); later news anchor at CIXK-FM in Owen Sound, Ontario; retired June 2013

Global Montreal

Global News at 5:30 is anchored by Jamie Orchard with Anthony Farnell on weather from Toronto. Previously a one-hour-long show, Global News at 5:30 was split into two half-hour newscasts in 2018. Global News at 6:30 is also anchored by Jamie Orchard and airs after Global National. Global News at 6 is anchored by Mark Carcasole from Toronto on weekends.

Global Halifax and New Brunswick

Global News at 6 on CIHF-DT is anchored by Sarah Ritchie with Anthony Farnell on weather and Rob Leth on sports on weekdays. Global News at 11 is anchored by Crystal Goomansingh with Anthony Farnell on weather and Rob Leth on sports on weekends.

Notable former personalities
 Janet Stewart - evening anchor (now working at CBC in Winnipeg)

Global Lethbridge
Global News at 5 is CISA's flagship newscast which is anchored by Liam Nixon with Paul Dunphy on weather from Calgary. Global News at 6 also airs following Global National. CISA previously had a one-hour-long newscast, known as News Hour, from 6-7pm, however it was shortened to half an hour in 2014, with the latter half replaced with a simulcast of Global Calgary's News Hour.

Notable former personalities
 Holly Horton (now co-host of TSN's SportsCentre)
 Jackson Proskow (now National Bureau Chief with Global National in Washington, D.C.)

Media information

Online media
People can watch the News Hour on the online Global video player in Canada.

References

External links
Global Television Network
Global News
Global News BC
Global News Calgary
Global News Edmonton
Global News Lethbridge
Global News Saskatoon
Global News Regina
Global News Winnipeg
Global News Toronto
Global News Montreal
Global News Maritimes
Global News Okanagan
Global Video

1960s Canadian television news shows
English-language television shows
Global Television Network original programming
Television series by Corus Entertainment
Television shows filmed in Burnaby
Television shows filmed in Calgary
Television shows filmed in Edmonton
Television shows filmed in Saskatoon
Television shows filmed in Regina, Saskatchewan
Television shows filmed in Winnipeg
Television shows filmed in Toronto
Television shows filmed in Kingston, Ontario
Television shows filmed in Montreal
Television shows filmed in Halifax, Nova Scotia
1968 Canadian television series debuts
1970s Canadian television news shows
1980s Canadian television news shows
1990s Canadian television news shows
2000s Canadian television news shows
2010s Canadian television news shows
2020s Canadian television news shows